X1 Media City is a residential development in Salford Quays, Greater Manchester, England. When fully built, the scheme will comprise four identical 85 m (277 ft) tall, 26-storey high-rise towers, each containing 275 apartments (1,100 in total). Towers 1 and 2 have been constructed, completing in 2017 and 2019 respectively. As of February 2023, Tower 3 is under construction and Tower 4 is yet to start.

The towers were designed by architects AHR. As of 2023, Towers 1 and 2 are the joint eighth-tallest buildings in Salford and the joint 28th-tallest buildings in Greater Manchester.

History

Planning
The original planning application for four 26-storey buildings comprising 1,036 apartments was submitted to Salford City Council in October 2006, with a further application submitted in April 2010 to extend the time to implement the original planning permission. In May 2015, an amendment application was submitted to increase the number of apartments to 1,100. Planning approval was obtained in September 2015.

Construction
The construction of Tower 1 commenced in 2015 and was completed in 2017. Tower 2 started construction in 2017 and was completed in 2019. The construction of Tower 3 began in 2019, and as of February 2023 the floors up to level 13 were fully complete, with works ongoing up to level 26.

Facilities
Towers 1 and 2 both include an on-site cinema, private gym and underground parking, as well as retail units on the ground and first floors.

Harbour City tram stop on the Eccles Line of the Metrolink system is located directly outside X1 Media City.

Gallery

See also
List of tallest buildings and structures in Salford
List of tallest buildings and structures in Greater Manchester
MediaCityUK

References

Buildings and structures in Salford